Rev. Hope Atherton (1646–1677) was a colonial clergyman. He was born in Dorchester, Massachusetts. Harvard Class of 1665. He was the minister of Hadley, Massachusetts. He served as a chaplain in the King Philips War and got separated from troops during the Battle of Great Falls in 1676. He died months after the battle, aged 30.

Early life
Atherton was the tenth child of twelve and fourth son of Major General Humphrey Atherton and Mary Kennion. He was baptized on August 30, 1646, in First Church of Dorchester. He was one of the youngest of the large family whose patriarch, Humphrey Atherton, held prominent public, judicial, and military positions.

His father and members of the congregation had established first elementary school supported by public money in the New World in 1639. A school that both he and his siblings would have attended.

His father suddenly died in an accident in 1661, when he was just 15 years of age.

Some records in Harvard record his name as Sperantious; Hope in Latin.

Teacher and clergyman
At the age of 22 he was recorded as the only teacher in his native town of Dorchester, at The Mather School, until he was replaced by John Foster. Atherton departed the environs of Boston and ventured westward into the Connecticut Valley, and began serving as a minister in Hatfield during the fall of 1668. However, on May 17, 1669, the people of Hatfield, formally invited him to settle there as their minister. Dorchester records, from a few weeks later, read: 

The Town of Hatfield, originally an outlying section of Hadley on the western bank of the Connecticut River, was incorporated on May 31, 1670. On August 8, at the very first town meeting, it was recorded: 
 

The formation of the church and Atherton's ordination took place during March 1671. He was made a freeman of the town in May 1672.

Battle of Bloody Brook
The Pocomtuc tribe, allied with the Nipmuc, were aggrieved by the English colonists encroaching on their settlements. Hostilities flared in 1675 across Massachusetts. This was the era of King Philip's War and Mohawk incursions eastwards. The Battle of Bloody Brook was fought on September 18, 1675, between colonial militia from the Massachusetts Bay Colony and Native Americans led by the Nipmuc sachem Muttawmp, during King Philip's War. 

Atherton, was allegedly the chosen chaplain of Captain Lathrop's company, a militia who escorted colonists traveling in loaded wagons, transporting the harvest from Deerfield to Hadley.  A large contingent of reportedly 700 Native Americans ambushed the group, resulting in the death of 40 militia men and 17 teamsters, out of a company that included 79 militia. Only 10 colonists survived the attack, solely due to the quick intervention of another militia group in Deerfield who heard the gunshots, led by Major Treat of Hadley and Captain Mosely of Deerfield. The Genealogical and Historical Memoir of the Otis Family cited above, and that of the Hollister Family of America, may have confused this battle with Turner Falls, since no other source has yet to tie Atherton to being a survivor of Bloody Brook. It is unclear whether he accompanied Lathrop’s militia on that fateful day.

Battle of Turner's Falls
The spring of 1676 saw several skirmishes between garrisoned troops in the Connecticut valley and Native American tribes of the region. Towns were attacked as far south as Windsor, CT and as far north as Deerfield, Massachusetts, where his cousin Rev.Samuel Mather (Independent minister) had been a minister. During the month of March the Northampton stockade was breached and Atherton's town of Hatfield was now threatened. By early May, between seventy and eighty cattle were stolen from the new settlers, from fields north of Hatfield by a group of Native Americans who then encamped to celebrate and feast at Peskeompskut, later called Turners Falls, Massachusetts.

On May 18, 1676, a force of 141 men, gathered at Hatfield for a march northward under Capt. William Turner to attack the Native American encampment north of Deerfield, Massachusetts. Alternative sources say they left the previous day. Atherton accompanied the expedition as its chaplain. After an all-night march, the English militia and volunteer settlers achieved their goal of surprise and at daybreak of the 19th attacked and massacred scores of Native Americans; some warriors but mostly women and children. However the sound of the falls masked the arrival of a much larger group of warriors and a counter attack commenced, with the militia losing 42 men, including Capt. Turner.

Atherton was among a half a dozen who were separated from the main body during the chaotic retreat. This event would be marked in history as the Battle of Turner's Falls; however it is also referred to as the Peskeompscut massacre. 

Atherton eventually found his own way back to Hadley. However many of the settlers were highly skeptical of the exceptional experiences he recalled, especially in regard to the Native Americans fleeing upon his attempted surrender  and the mystery of how he crossed the Connecticut River to eventually stumble into Hadley.

Contemporary historians refer to this event as the Battle of Great Falls, instead of attributing the event solely to Captain William Turner.

Atherton's sermon
Compelled to respond to those who doubted his story of wandering in the wilderness, near starvation and trying to evade capture, Atherton shared his experiences in a sermon, which he delivered in the Hatfield church on May 28, 1676:

Atherton was not alone; Jonathan Wells, a 16-year-old boy, also part of the expedition, was left bed-ridden for a full year and by his own account it took him up to four years to fully recover from the battle and its aftermath.

Atherton's health never fully recovered from the exposure he suffered while lost in the woods.  and he died June 8, 1677, at age 30.

Hatfield was without minister from the death of Atherton in 1677, until the call of Rev. Nathaniel Chauncey was accepted in 1683. The poverty brought by the King Philips War meant that a settlement of £40 for his widow Sarah was not released until 1679; three years after his death.

Personal
Atherton married Sarah Hollister (1646–1691), the daughter of John Hollister and Joanna Treat from Wethersfield, Connecticut, in 1674. They had three children: 

 Hope Atherton, born on January 7, 1675, in Hatfield, Massachusetts. Died in infancy.
 Joseph Atherton, born January 7, 1675, in Hatfield, Massachusetts. The surviving twin. He settled in Deerfield and became a selectmen there in 1715. He died in Gill, Massachusetts, on October 13, 1753, aged 78
 Sarah (Atherton) Parsons, born October 26, 1676, in Hatfield, Massachusetts

He was buried at Hill Cemetery, Hatfield, Hampshire County, Massachusetts. There is no gravestone or marker.

His widow, Sarah, married Lieutenant Timothy Baker of Northampton and with her two children, Joseph and Sarah moved to live with him. Sarah became the mother of 7 more children; Timothy, John, Edward, Grace, Prudence, Deliverance; and of the much celebrated Captain Thomas Baker, who married Christine Otis, who had been captured by Native Americans as a child. Captain Baker's war record mentions the release of English civilians including the Otis family. 
Sarah Baker, Atherton's wife, died December 8, 1691, in Northfield, Hampshire County, Massachusetts.

Legacy
His son Joseph Atherton was involved in the historical recording of his father's involvement in 1717.

Some sixty years after the Battle of Turner’s Falls, a grant was made by the General Court of a township of land, in e vicinity of where the event had taken place. The list of the survivors and the descendants who were then entitled to receive apportionment of a total of 6 mi2 included his only son to reach adulthood, Joseph Atherton. The township is now known as Bernardston.

Atherton has been referred to as "Hopestill", instead of "Hope" in the Suffolk County Probate Records.

Adelbert S. Atherton is a notable descendant.

See also
 Angel of Hadley
 Battle of Bloody Brook
 Battle of Turner's Falls
 Increase Mather
 Wheeler's Surprise

References

Further reading
 Connecticut State Library, Connecticut Archives Series, Colonial War, Series I, 1675–1775. Documents 45, 60, 67, 71, 74.
 Easton, John. Franklin B. Hough, Editor, A Narrative Of the Causes which led to Philip's Indian War, of 1675 and 1676, by John Easton, of Rhode Island. Albany, NY: J. Munsell, 1858.
 Hubbard, William. A Narrative of the Troubles with the Indians in New England. Boston, MA: John Foster, 1675.
 Harris, William (Leach, Edward Douglas, Ed). A Rhode Islander Reports On King Philip's War, the Second William Harris Letter of August 1676. Providence: Rhode Island Historical Society, 1963.
 Judd, Sylvester. History of Hadley (Springfield, MA: H.R. Hunting & Company, 1905): June 22, 1676.
 L'Estrange, Roger. A New and Further Narrative of the State of New-England, Being A Continued Account of the Bloudy Indian-War, From March till August, 1676 (London, UK: F.B. for Dorman Newman, 1676) : Ca. May 19, 1676 
 L'Estrange, Roger. A True Account of the Most Considerable Occurrences that have hapned in the Warre Between the English and the Indians in New England, From the Fifth of May, 1676, to the Fourth of August last (London, UK: Printed for Benjamin Billinsley at the Printing- Press in Cornhill, 1676) : Ca. May 19, 1676. 
 Massachusetts State Archives, Massachusetts Archives Series. April 25, 1676. Volume 69, Document 6.
 Mather, Increase. A Brief History of the War with the Indians in New-England (Boston, MA: John Foster, 1676): Ca. May 18, 1676
 Mather, Increase. A relation of the troubles which have happened in New-England by 16 reason of the Indians there from the year 1614 to the year 1675. Boston, MA: John Foster, 1677. 
 Rowlandson, Mary. Narrative of the Captivity and Removes of Mrs. Mary Rowlandson, fifth edition. Lancaster: Carter, Andrews and Co., 1828. 
 Sheldon, George. A History of Deerfield, Massachusetts: the times when the people by whom it was settled, unsettled and resettled, Press of E.A. Hall & Co., Greenfield, 1896. Two volumes.
Shurtleff, Nathaniel B., ed. Records of the Governor and Company of The Massachusetts Bay in New England. Boston: William White, 1853.
 Trumbull, J. Hammond, ed. The Public Records of the Colony of Connecticut, From 1665 to 1678 with the Journal of the Council of War 1675 to 1678. Hartford, CT: F. A. Brown, 1852.
 Wells, Daniel White and Reuben Field Wells. History of Hatfield, Massachusetts, in three parts. Springfield, MA: F.C.H. Gibbons, 1910 P. 85 and 466.

External links
 Hatfield Historical Society
 History of the Connecticut Valley

1646 births
17th-century Christian clergy
1677 deaths
American sermon writers
Harvard College alumni
History of religion in the United States
Massachusetts colonial-era clergy
People from Dorchester, Massachusetts
People of colonial Massachusetts